Lincoln County is located between the Arkansas Timberlands and Arkansas Delta in the U.S. state of Arkansas. It is also within the Pine Bluff metro area, and on the outer edge of the Central Arkansas region. The county is named for President Abraham Lincoln. Created as Arkansas's 65th county on March 28, 1871, Lincoln County has three incorporated cities, including Star City, the county seat and most populous city. The county contains 46 unincorporated communities and ghost towns, Cane Creek State Park at the confluence of Cane Creek and Bayou Bartholomew, and nine listings on the National Register of Historic Places to preserve the history and culture of the county.

Lincoln County occupies  and contained a population of 12,941 as of the 2020 Census. The rural economy is largely based on agriculture. The state has built two prisons here that also provide some local jobs. Poverty and unemployment rates are above national averages, but steady. Household incomes are below state and national averages. Politically, the white-majority Lincoln County has transitioned from reliably Democratic in presidential elections to steadily Republican since the election of Barack Obama. 

Lincoln County is served by two school districts, Star City School District and Dumas Public Schools. Higher education and healthcare are available in Pine Bluff to the north or Monticello to the south. Although no Interstate highways serve Lincoln County, the county has access to two United States highways (U.S. Route 65 [US 65], US 425) and eight Arkansas state highways. Lincoln County is also served by one public owned/public use general aviation airport, Star City Municipal Airport, and six community water systems provide potable water to customers in the county.

History
The county was established in 1871 during the Reconstruction era by the Arkansas General Assembly from parts of Arkansas, Bradley, Desha, Drew, and Jefferson counties. It was named for President Abraham Lincoln. The Republican Party was chosen by most freedmen after they got the franchise, as it was the one that secured their emancipation after the Civil War. Some white Union sympathizers, including veterans who decided to stay in the South, also voted for Republican candidates, and some were elected to state offices in former Confederate states. 

County government was first permanently established in Star City. The county had a second county seat at Varner from 1885 to 1912.

Geography

Lincoln County's geography is defined by two physiographic regions of Arkansas: the Arkansas Timberlands and the Arkansas Delta (in Arkansas, usually referred to as "the Delta"). These two regions are separated by Bayou Bartholomew, the world's longest bayou, which approximately splits the county into eastern and western halves with significant differences in geography. In the east, the Arkansas Delta is a subregion of the Mississippi Alluvial Plain, which is a flat area consisting of rich, fertile sediment deposits from the Mississippi River between Louisiana and Illinois. The western half is part of the Arkansas Timberlands, a portion of the Gulf Coastal Plain characterized by flat pine and cypress forests and silviculture rather than row agriculture.

Lincoln County is surrounded by two Delta counties to the east, Arkansas County and Desha County, and a Timberlands county to the west, Cleveland County. Jefferson County to the north and Drew County are border counties similar to Lincoln County, with Bayou Bartholomew delineating a similarly split geography.

Protected areas

Lincoln County contains two protected areas. Cane Creek State Park is a 2,053-acre (831 ha) state park located on the border between the West Gulf Coastal Plain and Arkansas Delta, with a 1,675 acre (678 ha) lake at the center. Fishing, canoeing, and kayaking are available on the lake in addition to pavilions, trails, and a visitor center with gift shop on land. The park offers 29 RV/tent camping sites with water and electric hookups, and is owned and operated by the Arkansas Department of Parks and Tourism.

Huff's Island Public Use Area is located on the Arkansas River in northeastern Lincoln County. Managed by the United States Army Corps of Engineers, the park does not have a boat ramp or camping, but offers day use, river bank access from March–September, and four picnic sites.

Demographics

2020 census

As of the 2020 United States census, there were 12,941 people, 3,773 households, and 2,711 families residing in the county.

2000 census
As of the 2000 census, there were 14,492 people, 4,265 households, and 3,130 families residing in the county. There were 4,955 housing units at an average density of 9 per square mile (3/km2). The racial makeup of the county was 64.88% White, 32.92% Black or African American, 0.40% Native American, 0.06% Asian, 0.01% Pacific Islander, 0.99% from other races, and 0.75% from two or more races.  1.81% of the population were Hispanic or Latino of any race.

There were 4,265 households, out of which 34.80% had children under the age of 18 living with them, 54.30% were married couples living together, 14.80% had a female householder with no husband present, and 26.60% were non-families. 23.50% of all households were made up of individuals, and 10.60% had someone living alone who was 65 years of age or older.  The average household size was 2.63 and the average family size was 3.11.

In the county, the population was spread out, with 22.20% under the age of 18, 12.40% from 18 to 24, 33.20% from 25 to 44, 20.40% from 45 to 64, and 11.90% who were 65 years of age or older.  The median age was 35 years. For every 100 females, there were 142.30 males.  For every 100 females age 18 and over, there were 154.70 males.

The median income for a household in the county was $29,607, and the median income for a family was $35,408. Males had a median income of $28,890 versus $19,990 for females. The per capita income for the county was $12,479.  About 15.50% of families and 19.50% of the population were below the poverty line, including 26.60% of those under age 18 and 17.90% of those age 65 or over.

Economy
The Arkansas Department of Correction, which operates the Cummins Unit and the Varner Unit in Lincoln County, is one of the county's major employers.

Human resources

Education

Educational attainment in Lincoln County is typical for a rural Arkansas county, with a 2012 study finding 78.4% of Lincoln County residents over age 25 held a high school degree or higher and 8.9% holding a bachelor's degree or higher. The Lincoln County rates are below Arkansas averages of 84.8% and 21.1%, and significantly below national averages of 86.7% and 29.8%, respectively.

Primary and secondary education

One public school district is based in Lincoln County; the Star City School District, which serves the western two-thirds of the county. The remainder of the county is served by the Dumas Public School District, based in Dumas. Successful completion of the curriculum of these schools leads to graduation from Star City High School or Dumas New Tech High School, respectively. Both high schools offer Advanced Placement (AP) courses and are accredited by the Arkansas Department of Education (ADE). Dumas Public Schools is also accredited by AdvancED.

The school districts at Gould and Grady were merged into Dumas and Star City for the 2004–05 school year pursuant to the Public Education Reorganization Act passed by the Arkansas Legislature.

Higher education
Lincoln County does not contain any institutions of higher education. The three nearest institutions in the region are University of Arkansas at Monticello to the south and Southeast Arkansas College (SEARK) and University of Arkansas at Pine Bluff in Pine Bluff to the north, all public four-year colleges.

Library system
The Star City Branch Library in downtown Star City is a member library of the Southeast Arkansas Regional Library system. The location offers books, e-books, media, reference, youth, business and genealogy services.

Public health
Lincoln County's above-average poverty rate suggests a high Medicaid eligibility rate. As of 2012, 25.6% of Lincoln County was eligible for Medicaid, with 62.8% of children under 19 eligible for ARKids First, a program by the Arkansas Department of Human Services that combines children's Medicaid (ARKids A) and other programs for families with higher incomes (ARKids B). These values are more in line with statewide averages than typical values for rural Arkansas counties.

The county's population is significantly above healthy weight, with 69.8% of adults and 43.5% of children/adolescents ranking as overweight or obese, above the state averages of 67.1% and 39.3%, themselves significantly above national averages of 62.9% and 30.3%, respectively.

The Jefferson Regional Medical Center in Pine Bluff is a community hospital offering acute inpatient care, emergency care, cardiology, home health, inpatient hospice, neurology, surgery, and the UAMS South Central Family Residency Program. The facility is rated as a Level 4 Trauma Center by the Arkansas Department of Health. Baptist Health Medical Center and CHI St. Vincent Infirmary are referral hospitals in Little Rock. The nearest Level 1 Trauma Centers are Arkansas Children's Hospital (ACH, or "Children's") and University of Arkansas for Medical Sciences (UAMS), both in Little Rock.

Public safety
The Lincoln County Sheriff's Office is the primary law enforcement agency in the county. The agency is led by the Lincoln County Sheriff, an official elected by countywide vote every four years.

The county is under the jurisdiction of the Lincoln County District Court, a state district court. State district courts in Arkansas are courts of original jurisdiction for criminal, civil (up to $25,000), small claims, and traffic matters. State district courts are presided over by a full-time District Judge elected to a four-year term by a districtwide election. The district is subdivided into the Star City (city), Star City (county), Gould, and Grady departments. All departments of Lincoln County District Court are located at 300 South Drew, and are presided over by one District Judge, who is elected in a countywide election. Superseding district court jurisdiction is the 11th West Judicial Circuit Court, which covers Jefferson and Lincoln counties. The 11th West Circuit contains six circuit judges, elected to six-year terms circuitwide.

State prisons

The Arkansas Department of Correction operates two prisons in unincorporated areas in the county. The Varner Unit is located in Varner, and the Cummins Unit is near Varner.

Government

The county government is a constitutional body granted specific powers by the Constitution of Arkansas and the Arkansas Code. The quorum court is the legislative branch of the county government and controls all spending and revenue collection. Representatives are called justices of the peace and are elected from county districts every even-numbered year. The number of districts in a county vary from nine to fifteen, and district boundaries are drawn by the county election commission. The Lincoln County Quorum Court has nine members. Presiding over quorum court meetings is the county judge, who serves as the chief operating officer of the county. The county judge is elected at-large and does not vote in quorum court business, although capable of vetoing quorum court decisions.

Politics
Lincoln County historically followed the Solid South voting trend of strong support for Democrats. However, following the election of Arkansas Governor Bill Clinton, the county has turned increasingly Republican, including in state and local races.

In Congress, Arkansas has been represented by two Republican senators (John Boozman and Tom Cotton) since January 3, 2015, ending a long history of Democratic hegemony. In the House of Representatives, Lincoln County is within the Arkansas 1st district with many other agricultural Delta counties on the eastern side of the state. The Arkansas 1st has been represented by Rick Crawford since 2010.

In the Arkansas State Senate, Lincoln County is split essentially in half between north and south. The northern half is within District 25, which also includes most of Jefferson and Phillips counties and a small portion of Desha County. The district has been represented by Stephanie Flowers, a Democratic lawyer from Pine Bluff, since January 2013. The southern half of Lincoln County is within District 26, which reaches to the southeastern corner of the state. District 26 has been represented by Eddie Cheatham, a Democratic retired educator from Crossett, since January 2013.

In the Arkansas House of Representatives, Lincoln County is split among three districts. The western third of Lincoln County is within District 10, which includes parts of four nearby counties. District 10 has been represented by Mike Holcomb since January 2013. Holcomb was initially elected as a Democrat, but switched to the Republican party in August 2015. The eastern third of the county is within District 12, which extends across Arkansas and Desha counties to include all of Phillips County. District 12 has been represented by Chris Richey, a Democratic pastor from Helena-West Helena, since January 2013. A small portion in northern Lincoln County, including Grady and Varner, is within District 16. The district contains the eastern half of Jefferson County, including the southeastern half of Pine Bluff, and has been represented by Ken Ferguson, a Democrat, since January 2015. District 13 has been represented by David Hillman since 2013.

Taxation

Property tax is assessed by the Lincoln County Assessor annually based upon the fair market value of the property and determining which tax rate, commonly called a millage in Arkansas, will apply. The rate depends upon the property's location with respect to city limits, school district, and special tax increment financing (TIF) districts. This tax is collected by the Lincoln County Collector between the first business day of March of each year through October 15th without penalty. The Lincoln County Treasurer disburses tax revenues to various government agencies, such as cities, county road departments, fire departments, libraries, and police departments in accordance with the budget set by the quorum court.

Communities

Cities
 Gould
 Grady
 Star City (county seat)

Lincoln County has 46 unincorporated communities and ghost towns within its borders. This is due to early settlers in Arkansas tending to settle in small clusters rather than incorporated towns. For example, communities like Varner had a post office and dozens of buildings at some point in their history. Other communities are simply a few dwellings at a crossroads that have adopted a common place name over time. Some are officially listed as populated places by the United States Geological Survey, and others are listed as historic settlements.

Unincorporated communities

Avery
Branchville
Cades
Calhoun
Cornerville
Crigler
 Cummins Unit
Douglas
Feenyville
Flynn
Fresno
Garnett
Garrett Bridge
Glendale
Gourd
Little Garnett
Maroney
Mills
Nebo
Palmyra
Phenix
Relfs Bluff
Rose Hill
Sarassa
Shannon Tank
Tarry
Tyro
Varner
Warrenton
Whitefield
Woodville
Yorktown

Historical communities

Champion
Four Groves
Kimbrough
Oakdale
Quawpaw Village
Rest
Silt
South Bend
Todd
Villa Vale
Youngstown

Townships

 Auburn
 Bartholomew
 Cane Creek (contains Star City)
 Choctaw (contains Grady)
 Gould (contains Gould)
 Kimbrough
 Lone Pine
 Mill Creek
 Owen
 Smith
 Spring
 Wells Bayou

Source:

Infrastructure

Aviation
Lincoln County contains one public owned/public use general aviation airport, Star City Municipal Airport. For the twelve-month period ending February 28, 2014, the facility saw 5,400 general aviation operations. The nearest commercial service airport is Clinton National Airport in Little Rock.

Major highways

The most heavily traveled highway in Lincoln County is U.S. Highway 65, with 7,700 vehicles per day estimated in Gould in 2016. The route connects travelers to Pine Bluff (and Little Rock via Interstate 530 [I-530]) to the north, and Mississippi and Louisiana to the south. U.S. Highway 425 crosses the county from south to north, passing through Star City. Highway 530 was opened to traffic in 2013 as two lanes of a future four-lane controlled access facility between Pine Bluff and the future Interstate 69 in Monticello. Currently, the route serves as direct access to Pine Bluff and points north for Star City travelers, in less distance than US 65.

Eleven state highways serve the traveling public in the county, varying from short connector routes to long highways traversing the entire county. Highway 11 is an important highway in the county, running from US 63 just over the Cleveland County line northeast through Star City and Grady to Huff's Island park on the Arkansas River. Highway 54 crosses the county from east to west on a winding, indirect route between Dumas and Pine Bluff. Highway 114 and Highway 212 serves as east–west routes across the county. Highway 83, Highway 199, and Highway 293 are rural routes in the south, north and southeast parts of Lincoln County, respectively. Highway 388 runs from US 65 toward Cummins and Varner units. Highway 980 connects Star City Municipal Airport to Highway 114. Two unsigned state highways Highway 600 and Highway 831, serve as institutional roads for Cane Creek State Park and the state prisons, respectively.

Utilities

Water
The Arkansas Department of Health (ADH) is responsible for the regulation and oversight of public water systems throughout the state. Six community water systems are based in Lincoln County: Yorktown Water Association, Arkansas Department of Corrections - Cummins Unit, Star City Water, Gould Municipal Water/Sewer, Grady Waterworks, and the Garrett Bridge Water Association. All of these utilities use the Sparta Sand Aquifer for source water. Small, rural parts of the county are served by the Highway 63 Water Association and the Ladd Water Association.

Yorktown Water Association has the largest retail population, with 8,169 total retail population, mostly within Lincoln County. ADC Cummins Unit has a retail population of 3,800, followed by Star City with 2,842, Gould with 1,041, and all others under 1,000 retail population served.

Wastewater
The Arkansas Department of Environmental Quality (ADEQ) regulates and oversees wastewater treatment and discharge permits in the state. Lincoln County contains three municipal wastewater systems, and one active domestic NPDES permit for Cummins Unit.

See also

 List of lakes in Lincoln County, Arkansas
 National Register of Historic Places listings in Lincoln County, Arkansas

Notes

References

Further reading
 

 
1871 establishments in Arkansas
Populated places established in 1871
Pine Bluff metropolitan area
Little Rock–North Little Rock–Conway metropolitan area